OOO Volkswagen Group Rus was a subsidiary of Volkswagen AG, which grew from an investment agreement signed on 29 May 2006.

History 
The company was established as the official importer for the Volkswagen vehicles in Russia in 2003. On 28 November 2007 production started with  semi-knocked-down assembly of Škoda Octavia and Volkswagen Passat vehicles. In April 2008, the Volkswagen Jetta was added; followed by Polo in June 2010. The design of the chassis of the Polo was adapted, and more resistant paints were used specifically to meet Russian requirements; this was the first adaptation of a Volkswagen model to the Russian market.

Construction and opening of the Kaluga factory 

The decision to build the plant was made by the Executive Committee on 26 May 2006. There were more than 70 alternatives to choose from; eventually they chose Kaluga. Present at the opening ceremony were Deputy Prime Minister of the Russian Federation, Sergei Naryshkin, and CEO of Volkswagen AG, Martin Winterkorn. The factory employs 3,000 people, who produced 124,000 vehicles in 2020.

In the first year, the production was 20,000 units, as the construction of the plant was only completed at the beginning of 2009. For the construction of the production site, VW used a total investment of 500 million Euro.

Contract manufacture at the Nizhny Novgorod factory 
With the end of production of automobiles at GAZ, an agreement was signed on 14 June 2011 for contract assembly in Nizhny Novgorod, which was prolonged in June 2017. In 2020, 52,200 VW vehicles were assembled in Nizhny Novgorod.

Company structure 
The group is the parent company of Audi Russia, Škoda Group Russia, Volkswagen Russia, Scania Russia and Volkswagen Commercial Vehicles Russia. The headquarters are in the Yugo-Zapadny Administrative Okrug of Moscow.

Brands 
Company management includes an executive team and sales and marketing managers for each of the brands sold in Russia, which include:
 VW Passenger Cars
 Volkswagen Commercial Vehicles
 Audi
 Škoda Auto
 Bentley
 Lamborghini
 Ducati

Production ending 
In 2022, due to the Russian invasion of Ukraine, Volkswagen announced that the Kaluga plant will close and imports will be suspended. The venture with GAZ also stopped.

Other 
The vehicle identification number for the Kaluga factory has world manufacturer code XW8 and factory code K in the eleventh position.

The Volkswagen Group Rus was the official partner of the 2014 Winter Olympics in Sochi and provided over 3,000 vehicles for this purpose.

References 

Volkswagen Group
Defunct motor vehicle manufacturers of Russia
Motor vehicle assembly plants in Russia
Companies based in Kaluga Oblast
Companies based in Moscow
Vehicle manufacturing companies established in 2006
Vehicle manufacturing companies disestablished in 2022
2006 establishments in Russia
2022 disestablishments in Russia
Russian subsidiaries of foreign companies